Mariya Ivanova Gabriel (née Nedelcheva) (born 20 May 1979) is a Bulgarian politician and a member of the  GERB party serving as European Commissioner for Innovation, Research, Culture, Education and Youth since 2019. She served as Member of the European Parliament (MEP) from 2009 to 2017.

In the European Parliament she served as Vice-President of the European People’s Party (EPP) group, Vice-President of EPP Women and head of the Bulgarian EPP delegation. She was first appointed to the European Commission in 2017 as European Commissioner for Digital Economy and Society to fill a spot left vacant by the departure of Kristalina Georgieva.

Biography

Education and training 

In 1997 Mariya Gabriel graduated from the Dr Petar Beron language high school in Kyustendil. In 2001 she graduated in Bulgarian and French languages at the Plovdiv University "Paisii Hilendarski".  She continued her studies at the Institut d'études politiques de Bordeaux (Institute of Political Studies) in Bordeaux (France), where she studied International Relations, History of the European Institutions, Political Sociology and Comparative Politics. In 2003 she obtained her master's degree in ‘Comparative Politics and International Relations’ from the Institut d'études politiques de Bordeaux.

Professional experience 

From 2004 to 2008, Mariya Gabriel was a teaching and research assistant at the Institute of Political Studies in Bordeaux (France). Her teaching assignment was related to the topics of the Decision Making process in the EU, Political Sociology and International Relations. She also participated in two international projects: the European EQUAL Programme 2004–2008 "Values and Economics – equality in professional activities and social economy" and the International research programme "Parliamentary Representation at national and European levels" under the leadership of Olivier Costa.

Member of the European Parliament

Vice-President of the EPP Group and Head of the Bulgarian delegation of the EPP Group 

From 2014 to 2017, Mariya Gabriel was Vice-President of the EPP Group and Head of the Bulgarian delegation in the EPP Group. As Vice-President of the EPP Group she chairs the Euromed Working Group of the EPP and is responsible for maintaining the EPP Group’s relations with countries from the Mediterranean, Middle East and North Africa regions on priority issues such as migration, security, the fight against terrorism and radicalisation, conflict prevention, and women’s rights. The EPP group Strategic position for the Mediterranean was prepared under her leadership.

Committee on Civil Liberties, Justice and Home Affairs – LIBE 

As member of the Committee on Civil Liberties, Justice and Home Affairs, since 2009 Mariya Gabriel focused her activities on the migration policy of the European Union, Schengen, visa liberalisation agreements with third countries, security issues, the fight against terrorism and human trafficking. She followed closely topics related to FRONTEX and the Entry-Exit System of the EU. She was a rapporteur of 1/3 of all visa liberalisation agreements of the EU, the last ones being with Colombia, Peru, Georgia and Ukraine.

Foreign Affairs Committee – AFET 

In the Foreign Affairs Committee Mariya Gabriel’s focus was on the Mediterranean countries, and relations between the EU and Africa, the Middle East and the countries from the Arab Peninsula. She was a negotiator of the EPP Group on a regular basis for resolutions related to human rights violations, democracy and the rule of law. She upheld the need for improved consistency of the foreign and internal policies of the EU, conflict prevention and conflict resolution, migration and security, economic links, and development policy.

Committee on Women's Rights and Gender Equality – FEMM 

From 2012 until 2014 Mariya Gabriel was a coordinator of the EPP Group in the Women’s Rights and Gender Equality Committee. In this field her work was focused on the fight against all forms of violence against women, work-life balance, women's entrepreneurship and women’s access to ICT sectors, equal pay for equal work, and women’s role in peacekeeping. She is the rapporteur of the European Parliament on the proposed Women on Boards directive. In 2016 she started a national campaign ‘Violence against women: let’s open eyes and break the silence’.

Committee on Agriculture and Rural Development – AGRI 

During the 2009–2014 legislature Mariya Gabriel was a member of the Committee on Agriculture and Rural Development and was actively working on the reform of the new EU common agricultural policy (CAP) for the 2014–2020 period. As part of her work, she defended the principles of a fair, flexible and simplified agricultural policy.

During the period 2011–2013, Mariya Gabriel organized a public debate "Agriculture and Politics – You are the link!" in a large number of cities in each region of Bulgaria. Discussions with farmers contributed the development of a national position in the context of the reform of the common agricultural policy for the 2014–2020 programming period.

From 2014 to 2017, Mariya Gabriel was President of the Working Group on Apiculture and Bee Health. In 2015 and 2016 she organised the European Week of Bees and Pollination in the European Parliament. In 2016 Albert II, Prince of Monaco, was a keynote speaker. As part of this event she established the European forum of beekeepers and farmers. In 2017 she started the national campaign ‘Honey breakfast’ in schools aiming to promote the contribution of bees for biodiversity and the benefits from the consumption of honey and other apiculture products.

The Danube Strategy 

Mariya Gabriel worked consistently on the Danube Strategy as a strategically important topic for the EU, based on the ‘bottom-up’ approach. It is a strategy for the Danube macro-region, which covers nine Member States (Austria, Bulgaria, Croatia, Czech Republic, Germany, Hungary, Romania, Slovakia and Slovenia) and 5 non-EU states (Serbia, Bosnia and Herzegovina, Montenegro, Ukraine and Moldova). In 2012 Mariya Gabriel organised a public debate on ‘The Danube Strategy – an opportunity to build the regions in Europe’, in partnership with the Ministry of Regional Development of the Republic of Bulgaria and Hanns Seidel Foundation. The objective was to encourage the direct participation of citizens in defining projects and in the implementation of better partnerships between communities and countries involved in the Danube Strategy.

EU foreign policy

ACP-EU Joint Parliamentary Assembly 

From 2009 Mariya Gabriel was an active member of the ACP-EU Joint Parliamentary Assembly, which brings together parliamentarians from the African, Caribbean and Pacific Group of States and the European Union. As part of the Assembly, she was a member of the Committee on Political Affairs. Her work focused on conflict prevention and conflict resolution, strengthening the rule of law, development, EU-Africa relations, the future of ACP-EU cooperation, relations with the African Union, and participation of women in the democratisation and reconciliation process.

Election observation missions of the EU 

In 2016 Mariya Gabriel led the EU Election Observation Mission for the presidential elections in Gabon. In 2011 she was Head of the EU Election Observation Mission for the presidential and parliamentary elections in the Democratic Republic of Congo. She also led the Electoral follow-up expert mission of the Union in 2014 aiming to take stock of the implementation of the recommendations.

Mariya Gabriel has been Head of 5 delegations of the European Parliament for election observation – Tanzania, Sudan, Nigeria, Sierra Leone and Jordan, as well as member of delegation in 7 missions – Togo, Burundi, Haiti, Kyrgyzstan, Chad, Burkina Faso and Uganda. She was among the MEPs who are experts on election observation missions.

European Commission 

On 10 May 2017 Jean-Claude Juncker, President of the European Commission, announced that Bulgarian Prime Minister Boyko Borisov had nominated Mariya Gabriel to replace Kristalina Georgieva as Commissioner.

President Juncker appointed Günther Oettinger to replace Georgieva as European Commissioner for Budget and Human Resources, leaving Gabriel with the digital portfolio Oettinger had previously headed.

In 2019, Ursula von der Leyen nominated Gabriel to be European Commissioner for Innovation, Research, Culture, Education and Youth.

Extra-parliamentary activities 

Initiatives related to young people take a central place in Mariya Gabriel's extra-parliamentary activities. She has established six European information centres in Bulgaria – two in Sofia, and one each in Blagoevgrad, Ruse, Burgas and Sliven. She organises training activities, presentations and campaigns aiming to familiarise young people with the benefits of Bulgaria’s membership of the EU. She is involved in the yearly school contests related to European affairs, and the national ‘Reader of the year’ campaign.

Personal life 
She is married to François Gabriel. The couple has one child.

Prizes and awards 
 2013 ‘MEP of the year’ Award in the ‘Gender Equality category;
 2015 Award of The European Association of Communications Agencies for her achievements in relations to gender equality and women’s rights;
 2016 "MEP of the year" Award in the Development category;
 2016 Order of San Carlos from the Government of Colombia for outstanding contribution to the nation of Colombia in the area of international relations and diplomacy;
 2019 'European Young Leader' nomination. She is now a European Young Leader (EYL40) alumni.

References

External links 

Mariya Gabriel – European Commission website
Mariya Gabriel - Open Access Government Prestige Contributor 

|-

1979 births
Bulgarian political scientists
Women MEPs for Bulgaria
GERB MEPs
Living people
MEPs for Bulgaria 2009–2014
MEPs for Bulgaria 2014–2019
People from Gotse Delchev
Bulgarian European Commissioners
European Commissioners 2014–2019
European Commissioners 2019–2024
Women political scientists
Institut d'études politiques de Bordeaux alumni